The World RX of Argentina is a Rallycross event held in Argentina for the FIA World Rallycross Championship. The event made its debut in the 2014 season, at the Circuito Rosendo Hernández in the town of San Luis. The event moved to Autódromo Municipal Juan Manuel Fangio in Rosario, Santa Fe for 2015.

Past winners

References

External links

Argentina
Auto races in Argentina